Grandfield is a city in Tillman County, Oklahoma, United States. The population was 1,038 at the 2010 census.

Geography
Grandfield is located at  (34.230213, -98.687646).

Climate

Demographics

As of the census of 2000, there were 1,110 people, 434 households, and 295 families residing in the city. The population density was 1,387.9 people per square mile (535.7/km2). There were 534 housing units at an average density of 667.7 per square mile (257.7/km2). The racial makeup of the city was 71.98% White, 9.37% African American, 3.51% Native American, 0.18% Asian, 11.17% from other races, and 3.78% from two or more races. Hispanic or Latino of any race were 18.92% of the population.

There were 434 households, out of which 31.6% had children under the age of 18 living with them, 53.0% were married couples living together, 10.8% had a female householder with no husband present, and 32.0% were non-families. 30.2% of all households were made up of individuals, and 16.4% had someone living alone who was 65 years of age or older. The average household size was 2.49 and the average family size was 3.10.

In the city, the population was spread out, with 25.9% under the age of 18, 7.7% from 18 to 24, 24.1% from 25 to 44, 22.8% from 45 to 64, and 19.5% who were 65 years of age or older. The median age was 38 years. For every 100 females, there were 92.4 males. For every 100 females age 18 and over, there were 89.0 males.

The median income for a household in the city was $21,500, and the median income for a family was $27,222. Males had a median income of $23,281 versus $16,250 for females. The per capita income for the city was $13,823. About 20.7% of families and 26.7% of the population were below the poverty line, including 38.6% of those under age 18 and 10.8% of those age 65 or over.

History

Opening the Big Pasture
The Big Pasture, approximately  bounded on the south by the Red River and presently located in parts of Comanche, Cotton, and Tillman counties, was the last settled territory in Oklahoma. Native control of the land traces to the Quapaw, who ceded it to the United States in 1818. The Choctaw and Chickasaw accepted the area in the 1820s and 1830s but lost it as a result of the Reconstruction Treaty of 1866. By the terms of the Medicine Lodge Treaty of 1867 a reservation that included the Big Pasture was set-aside for the Kiowa, Comanche, and Apache. The land became part of Oklahoma Territory in December 1906.

Opening bids to quarter-sections of the Big Pasture to prospective homesteader began on December 3 and ended on December 15, 1909. There were over 100,000 bids for the available 1,830 quarter-sections. Bids varied from $5,800 to $7,376.

Prior to the opening of the area, the United States platted five official townships: Randlett, Ahpeatone, Isadore, Quanah and Eschiti. The only town remaining today is Randlett. Eschiti was the official town nearest the present site of Grandfield.

Founding
Problems began when the Wichita Falls and Northwestern Railroad missed Eschiti by two miles and Kell City (named for the railroad promoter Frank Kell of Wichita Falls) sprang up along the railroad's route.

By 1907, Eschiti had an official United States Post Office and Kell City had the railroad. Citizens from both towns were in heated competition for new settlers and businesses moving to the area.

To try to settle the differences, Reverend Andrew J. Tant, a Baptist minister and homesteader, went into partnership with Frank Kell and offered free lots to businesses if they would relocate to the Tant farm, which would eventually become Grandfield. Since the Tant farm was only about a mile from Kell City, people willingly moved. Free lots were also promised to all churches and schools. Observers at that time wrote they could look through their windows and see lines of houses being moved. According to Mrs. Lawrence Hooks, an early settler, she once cooked breakfast in Eschiti and dinner in Grandfield, without leaving her house.

A committee appealed to the United States Post Office to establish a post office. Assistant Postmaster General Charles P. Grandfield was helpful in granting the request. Consequently, the town was named in his honor. On January 16, 1909, Grandfield citizens voted, almost unanimously, for incorporation, and the post office opened January 21, 1909. In 1910 the population stood at 830.
The town's founders and early residents came from a variety of locations, backgrounds, cultures and religions; the States of Kentucky, Tennessee, Kansas, Missouri, Arkansas and Texas were well represented, and a substantial number of newly arrived European immigrants also made their homes in Grandfield.

Oil boom
There were two oil fields discovered in the Grandfield area: the Northwest Oil Field; and the Red River Oil Field.
The influence of the oil industry on Grandfield cannot be overstated.  The closing of the Bell Oil and Refinery Company refinery in the 1960s arguably started the population decline.

Sports
Grandfield High School won the Oklahoma High School Football Class C Championship in 1948 and 1958. Switching from 11-man to 8-man football, they captured two Class C state football championships in 1992 and 1993. They also won the Girls Basketball Championship in 1968.
Despite the influence of All State forward Kenneth Johnson, the Boys Basketball team came up short in the 1978 Class B title game, losing to New Lima, the defending Class B champions.  During an era without a three-point scoring line, Johnson scored an Oklahoma state record 105 points on January 6, 1979 against Terral (OK) High School.
He also set state records for most points in a season (1,280 in 1978-79), and most points in a career (3,191).

Historic places
Grandfield's historic places included the Grandfield Downtown Historic District (NR 02000656), the William and Mabel Donahoo Hubbard House (NR 91000310), the Humphreys Drugstore Building (NR 92000797), the Rock Island Depot Building (NR 96000978), and the Tillman County Bank of Grandfield (NR 92000796).

References

Further reading
History of Tillman County, Vol. 2.  Frederick, OK: Tillman County Historical Society, 1978

Watson, Louise Michael. Come tour with me: tales of the Big Pasture. Stillwater, OK: New Forms Press, 1995

Watson, Louise Michael and Charles Woosley. Grandpa was a rounder: tales of the trails. Stillwater, OK: New Forums Press, 1997

Watson, Louise Michael. Big Pasture: a place and time in Oklahoma history: a mini book of many facts. Grandfield, OK: L.M. Watson [distributor], 1997

Wyatt, Robert Lee, III. Grandfield The Hub of the Big Pasture Volume I. Marceline, MO: Walsworth Publishers, 1974

Wyatt, Robert Lee, III. The Gateway to the Big Pasture: Devol. Marceline, MO: Walsworth Publishers, 1974

Wyatt, Robert Lee, III. Grandfield The Hub of the Big Pasture Volume II. Marceline, MO: Walsworth Publishers, 1975

Wyatt, Robert Lee, III. Grandfield The Hub of the Big Pasture Volume III. Stillwater, OK: New Forums Press, 1997

Wyatt, Robert Lee, III, Ph.D. (Foreword by Peggy Haverstock). The History of the Haverstock Tent Show: "The Show with a Million Friends."  Carbondale, IL: Southern Illinois University Press, 1997

External links
  Chamber of Commerce Website
 Grandfield Police Department Website
 Grandfield Downtown Historic District (NR 02000656)
  New Mexico State University Sculpture (Joy of Learning)

Cities in Oklahoma
Cities in Tillman County, Oklahoma